The 2012 Israeli Basketball League Cup was the 7th edition of the Israeli Basketball League Cup pre-season tournament. It plays between October 2 and October 6 mainly at Romema Arena in Haifa, as Kiryat Ata Hall hosted two quarterfinals games.

Teams Participating
As the format states, the top eight teams on the 2011–12 Israeli Super League should have competed in the tournament. However, two changes were made. One was caused by the owner of Habik'a, who finished in 8th place, moving his license To Eilat to form Hapoel Eilat. The second change was made as the hosts Maccabi Haifa replaced Ironi Ashkelon who finished at the 6th place last season.

Tournament Bracket

2012
League Cup